General elections were held in Uruguay on 25 November 1984, the first since the 1973 coup. Since then the country had been run by a civic-military dictatorship. The electoral process was considered transparent and marked the end of the dictatorship. The result was a victory for the Colorado Party, which won the most seats in the Chamber of Deputies and received the most votes in the presidential election.

Results

References

External links
Politics Data Bank at the Social Sciences School – Universidad de la República (Uruguay)

Uruguay
Elections in Uruguay
General
Uruguay
Julio María Sanguinetti